Wallace Arthur "Wally" Dollase (August 1, 1937 – October 30, 2015) was an American trainer and owner of Thoroughbred racehorses.

Among his numerous Graded stakes race wins, Dollase won the 1996 Breeders' Cup Distaff with Jewel Princess who was voted that year's Eclipse Award as the American Champion Older Female Horse. He also trained the 1990 American Champion Male Turf Horse, Itsallgreektome.

Wally Dollase and his wife "Cincy" (Cynthia) have a son Craig, and three daughters, Michelle, Carrie and Aimee. Both son Craig and daughter Aimee became trainers.

Dollase died on October 30, 2015, after a lengthy illness.

References

 

1937 births
2015 deaths
American horse trainers
People from Fort Atkinson, Wisconsin